Daniel J. Shea (born December 23, 1954) is a Canadian actor and stunt coordinator who is best known for his recurring role as Sgt. Siler on Stargate SG-1 and Stargate Atlantis.

Career
Shea was the stunt coordinator and Richard Dean Anderson's stunt double on Stargate SG-1. He previously served as Anderson's stand-in on MacGyver. He has appeared in episodes of three different series with Richard Dean Anderson: MacGyver, Stargate SG-1 and Stargate Atlantis. In Season 1, Episode 19 of Stargate SG-1; "Tin Man" he appeared as Colonel Jack O'Neill's (Richard Dean Anderson) 'clone'.

He has been credited in all 214 episodes of Stargate SG-1 as either an actor, stunt double or stunt coordinator.

Dan was the stunt coordinator on the movie X-Men: The Last Stand and the show Psych.

He appeared as the zombified Father Buckner in the 2012 horror film The Cabin in the Woods.

Personal life
Shea was born in Ontario. He has 2 daughters. He was a College Hockey player but suffered an eye injury which ended his sports career.

Filmography 

 Psych - stunt coordinator (2006–2014)
 Stargate SG-1 - actor, stunt double, stunt coordinator (1997–2007)
 Stargate Atlantis - actor, stunt performer, stunt double (2004–2007)
 The Cabin in the Woods - "Father Buckner"
 X-Men: Days of Future Past - Policeman (Uncredited)

External links 
 

1954 births
Living people
Canadian stunt performers
Canadian male television actors
Male actors from Ontario